Cercanias Sevilla is a commuter rail system operating in and around the Seville metropolitan area. Currently, it contains 5 separate lines, 251 kilometres of railway and 37 stations.

Lines and stations
The network consists of five lines and thirty-seven stations. The two busiest stations on the network in 2018 were Seville-Santa Justa and Seville-San Bernardo with 1.49 million passengers each, followed by Virgen del Rocío (751,000), Utrera (719,000) and Dos Hermanas (674,000).

Line C-1 Lora del Río - Sevilla Santa Justa - Lebrija

Line C-2 Sevilla-Santa Justa - Cartuja

Line C-3 Sevilla-Santa Justa - Cazalla-Constantina

Line C-4 Circular

Line C-5 Jardines de Hércules - Sevilla-Santa Justa - Benacazón

Future projects
A branch line connection to Seville Airport is planned.

References

Cercanías
Rail transport in Seville